Marotti is an Italian surname that may refer to

Davide Marotti (1881–1940), Italian chess player
Lou Marotti (1915–2003), American football player

See also
Mariotti (surname)

Italian-language surnames
Croatian surnames
Slovene-language surnames